Didghele Cave Natural Monument is a karst cave located near village Melouri in Tsqaltubo Municipality in Imereti region of Georgia, 418 meters above sea level.

Morphology 
Made of reef limestone (Barremian), the cave was created by river Osunela. The cave is 750 m in length. The river Didghele flows into the cave. It has many loamy ceilings, walls, clay slabs and more. An existing cleft at the entrance of the cave is a leaking stream, which also forms a small temporary lake.

Tourist information 
The cave is of average difficulty, but still requires special  equipment to visit it. It is part of extensive Tsqaltubo Cave system which also includes nearby cave Melouri.

See also 
 Bgheri Cave Natural Monument
 Prometheus Cave Natural Monument

References

Natural monuments of Georgia (country)
Caves of Georgia (country)
Protected areas established in 2011
Geography of Imereti